Baraeus orientalis is a species of beetle in the family Cerambycidae. It was described by Per Olof Christopher Aurivillius in 1907. It is known from Tanzania, Malawi, Kenya, Namibia, Zimbabwe, Somalia, Cameroon, Ethiopia, and Zambia.

References

Pteropliini
Beetles described in 1907